Zubi (and its variant Zoubi (Arabic: الزعبي)) is a name which is used as both a given name and a surname. Notable people with this name include:

Given name

Zubi (born 1993), Spanish footballer

Surname
 Abdullah Al-Zubi (born 1989), Jordanian football player
 Ahmed Zoubi, Libyan volleyball player
 Assad al Zubi (born 1956), Free Syrian Army general
 Ghaleb Zu'bi (born 1943), Jordanian lawyer and politician
 Mahmoud Al-Zoubi (1935–2000), Syrian politician 
 Musa Al-Zubi (born 1993), Jordanian professional footballer
 Omran al-Zoubi (1959–2018), Syrian politician and government minister
 Seif el-Din el-Zoubi (1913–1986), Israeli-Arab politician

See also
 Al-Zoubi, a Levantine family 

Arabic words and phrases
Arabic-language surnames